Jolly Harbour is a township on Antigua island, in Antigua and Barbuda.

Geography
The town is located on the southwest coast of the island in Saint Mary Parish, close to Bolands and south of Five Island Harbour. 
Jolly Harbour is a district of the Bolands community.

Tourism
The marina and commercial activity are a major draw for tourists, with Jolly Harbour having shops, bars, restaurants, a golf-course and a boatyard. The marina complex was developed on land that was previously a swamp and beach. The marina is dominated by the casino building, which has laid abandoned for many years.
The area is a popular location for expats to buy property as there is also a gated community.

Demographics 
Jolly Harbour has three enumeration districts.

 80100 Bolans-JollyBeach 

 80401  Bolans-JollyH_1 
 80402  Bolans-JollyH_2

Census Data (2011)

Individual

Household 
There are 295 households in Jolly Harbour.

References

Scott, C. R. (ed.) (2005) Insight guide: Caribbean (5th edition). London: Apa Publications.
 Best Antigua.com: Jolly Harbour

External links

Populated places in Antigua and Barbuda
Saint Mary Parish, Antigua and Barbuda
Beaches of Antigua and Barbuda